Nancy Smith (1881-1962) was a British designer. She began her career as a book illustrator but became one of the first professional female poster designers in Britain.

In 1916, Smith became a founder member of the Decorative Art Group, founded by Henry Nevinson. She created numerous posters for London Transport, including one showing Epping Forest in 1922, which had become accessible by the Central Line.

References

1881 births
1962 deaths
20th-century British women artists
People associated with transport in London
Transport design in London